Craig Mullins (born 1964) is an American digital painter, and leading international concept artist. He has created art for books, video games and films. He is often considered to be a pioneer in the field of digital painting, painting digitally for many years before drawing tablets were available.

Biography 
Craig Mullins was born in 1964 in California and moved at the age of three to Ohio. When he was 18, he went back to California, where for several years he lived in the proximity of Los Angeles. He went to Pitzer College in Claremont, California, for two years, and then studied at Art Center College of Design to study product design and illustration. He started out as a transportation designer and got a job at Ford in Detroit. There, he discovered that his design sense was a little bit too extreme for the car industry, so he returned to Art Center to study Illustration, where he got his BFA in 1990. Since then, he has worked on many projects as concept artist, illustrator and matte painter. Mullins realized that the digital era freed him from all geographical constraints, so he moved to Hawaii, where he lived for almost 20 years until he relocated back to mainland U.S. due to his sons attending school there.

He stated that he is trying to stay in as many areas of illustration as possible. His works are inspired by John Singer Sargent, Frank Frazetta.

Mullins has illustrated cards for the Magic: The Gathering collectible card game. He has also been invited to many seminars around the world, such as China and is also highly respected by Chinese artists such as Su Lin, a concept artist residing there.

Work

In books
He did book covers for the following books:
When Gravity Fails (2005 Orb edition)
A Fire in the Sun (2005 Orb edition)
The Exile Kiss (2005 Orb edition)
Halo Encyclopedia
Caturdays.. The Beginning (2005 Orb edition)
Caturdays.. The End (2005 Orb edition)
BioShock: Rapture (2011)
Murder of Souls (2011)

In film
He did matte paintings and concept art for these movies:
The Matrix Revolutions
Armageddon
Flubber
Contact
Apollo 13
Interview with the Vampire
Final Fantasy: The Spirits Within
Forrest Gump
Jurassic Park
Tangled
Spider-Man: Into the Spider-Verse
Alien

In video games
He did illustrations and concept art for the following videogames:
BioShock 2
Marathon
Myth II: Soulblighter
Halo: Combat Evolved
Halo 2
Call of Duty: Black Ops III
Age of Empires: Definitive Edition
Age of Empires II: Definitive Edition
Age of Empires III
Age of Empires III: Definitive Edition
Age of Empires IV
Need For Speed
Oni
Return to Castle Wolfenstein
Europa Universalis III
Fallout 3
Mass Effect 2
Assassin's Creed: Brotherhood
Call of Cthulhu: Dark Corners of the Earth
Dragon's Dogma
Crusader Kings III
World of Warcraft

Publications
Expose 1 by Ballistic Publishing Art of Halo

References

External links
Craig Mullins official site

1964 births
20th-century American painters
21st-century American painters
American illustrators
American male painters
American speculative fiction artists
Fantasy artists
Game artists
Living people
Matte painters
Painters from California
Painters from Ohio
20th-century American male artists